A bacalaíto is a salted codfish fritter, a traditional Puerto Rican snack that typically is eaten with an entire meal. Bacalaítos are served at the beach, cuchifritos, and at festivals. They are crispy on the outside and dense and chewy in the inside.

Description
In Puerto Rico, bacalaítos are served all over the island with many different versions. The salted cod is soaked in water over night to remove most of the salt or is boiled usually three times. The cod is then drained and shredded into a large bowl with all-purpose flour, baking powder, sazón (spice mix), sofrito, and  orégano brujo is the most common batter mix. The cod is then worked into the batter with water or milk, then deep-fried and when done should resemble a pancake.

References

Puerto Rican cuisine
Latin American cuisine